Giorgi Papunashvili (born 2 September 1995), commonly known as Papu, is a Georgian professional footballer who plays for Radnički Niš  and Georgian national team as a winger.

Club career

Dinamo Tbilisi
Papunashvili started his career in his hometown club Dinamo Tbilisi. In 2013, after having spent a single season with the reserve side of the Georgian club, Papunashvili was promoted to the first team and in November he made his debut in Erovnuli Liga against Tskhinvali.

During the 2014–15 season, Papunashvili became the key figure at Dinamo, scoring 16 goals in all tournaments with the club, including his first career hat-trick against Tskhinvali in October 2014. Dinamo won Georgian Cup at the end of the season as well, with Papunashvili scoring two goals in the final against Samtredia.
 
In summer 2015, Papunashvili signed a season-long loan deal with Werder Bremen. He joined the reserve side of the club and played in 3. Liga. The loan spell was unsuccessful, as Papunashvili missed 12 games due to injury and was only able to make 20 appearances for the club, scoring two goals.

Real Zaragoza
In June 2017, Papunashvili signed four-year deal with Real Zaragoza. He made his debut for the Spanish club against Granada CF on 28 August, replacing Oliver Buff.

On 12 January 2020, Papunashvili joined fellow second division side Racing de Santander on loan until the end of the season.

Apollon Limassol
On 24 December 2020, Zaragoza announced the transfer of Papunashvili to Cypriot club Apollon Limassol FC.

International career
Papunashvili made his debut for the national team in a 1–0 friendly loss against the United Arab Emirates on 3 June 2014.

He also represented Georgia national under-17 football team in the 2012 UEFA European Under-17 Championship in Slovenia.

Career statistics

Club

International goals
Scores and results list Georgia's goal tally first, score column indicates score after each Papunashvili goal.

Honours
Dinamo Tbilisi
Umaglesi Liga: 2013–14
Georgian Cup: 2013–14, 2014–15
Georgian Super Cup: 2014

References

External links

1995 births
Living people
Footballers from Georgia (country)
Association football wingers
Erovnuli Liga players
FC Dinamo Tbilisi players
3. Liga players
SV Werder Bremen II players
Segunda División players
Real Zaragoza players
Racing de Santander players
Apollon Limassol FC players
Georgia (country) international footballers
Georgia (country) under-21 international footballers
Expatriate footballers from Georgia (country)
Expatriate sportspeople from Georgia (country) in Spain
Expatriate sportspeople from Georgia (country) in Cyprus
Expatriate footballers in Germany
Expatriate footballers in Spain
Expatriate footballers in Cyprus